Highbury New Park is a street in Highbury in the London Borough of Islington which runs from Highbury Quadrant in the north to Highbury Grove in the south.

Buildings
The road was developed by Henry Rydon from 1853 in order to attract prosperous city businessmen to the area and there are now a large number of grade II listed Victorian villas in the road.

Notable former residents
C. Washington Eves, No. 49. West Indies Merchant.
David Gestetner, No. 124. Inventor.

In literature

14 Highbury New Park is the setting of The Ghost Downstairs by Leon Garfield (1972).

See also
Highbury Park

References

Further reading
"Highbury New Park. A nineteenth-century middle-class suburb" by T.F.M.Hinchcliffe in London Journal, 1981, pp. 29–44.

External links 

Streets in the London Borough of Islington
Highbury